The Edmonton Elks are  a professional Canadian football team based in Edmonton, Alberta.  The club competes in the Canadian Football League (CFL) as a member of the league's West Division and plays their home games at Commonwealth Stadium. The Elks were founded in 1949 as the Edmonton Eskimos and have won the Grey Cup championship fourteen times (including a three-peat between 1954 and 1956 and an unmatched five consecutive wins between 1978 and 1982), most recently in 2015. The team has a rivalry with the Calgary Stampeders and is one of the three community-owned teams in the CFL. The team discontinued using the Eskimos name in 2020, with the new name Elks formally announced on June 1, 2021.

Ownership 
The Edmonton Elks are one of three "community owned" teams in the CFL (owned by local shareholders).

Edmonton Elks Football Team, Inc., is governed by a ten-member board of directors. The board consists of a chairman, treasurer, secretary, and seven directors. , the board of directors included chairman Brad Sparrow, treasurer Janice Agrios, secretary Murray Scambler, directors Douglas Cox, Rob Heron, Ian Murray, Harold Roozen, Marshall Sadd, Lindsay Dodd and Tom Richards. The club's president and CEO was Chris Presson until he was fired on November 22, 2021.

History

Football in Edmonton 1895–1939
The Edmonton Rugby Foot-ball Club, unaffiliated with the current team, was an early Canadian football-rugby union team based in Edmonton. The team played its first organized games with the formation of the Alberta Rugby Football League in 1895. In 1908 the name Esquimaux was adopted. In 1910 the club was officially named the Edmonton Eskimos and was briefly called the Edmonton Elks during 1922. (The city was represented by the Edmonton Civics in 1914 and the Edmonton Canucks in 1919.) After appearing in and losing the 9th Grey Cup and 10th Grey Cup games (being the first western teams to play for the Cup) the team folded in 1925, but returned for two seasons beginning 1928, and then folded again. It was succeeded by the Edmonton Boosters, who played for three more seasons, and the Edmonton Hi-Grads in 1936 (a team of high school graduate all stars.) Elite-level football returned to Edmonton in 1938 with a team once again called the Eskimos, this time in the Western Interprovincial Football Union (WIFU). This team ceased operating after only two seasons because of the Second World War.

Team history

The current incarnation of the team began in the 1949 WIFU season as the Edmonton Eskimos under head coach Annis Stukus, for whom the CFL's annual coach of the year award is named. The team played home games at Clarke Stadium and quickly saw success under quarterback Jackie Parker and running back Johnny Bright, winning the Grey Cup three years in a row from 1954 to 1956. The team did not win the Grey Cup again until 1975, the longest drought in team history. The team moved to Commonwealth Stadium in 1978.

The team won five consecutive Grey Cups (1978–82), led by superstar quarterbacks Warren Moon and Tom Wilkinson and head coach Hugh Campbell. After a brief absence, Campbell returned to the team in 1986 and worked for Edmonton in an administrative capacity until his retirement in 2006. This five-year dynasty, followed by the dominance of the city's NHL team the Edmonton Oilers, led the city to be nicknamed the "City of Champions" in the 1980s. Edmonton made it to nine Grey Cups in a ten-year span from 1973 to 1982.

In the 1980s and 90s the team's marquee player was Gizmo Williams who still holds many CFL records in punt and kickoff returns and was a key part in Grey Cup victories in 1987 and 1993 under head coach Ron Lancaster. During this period the team was also known for its stellar defensive line, with future Canadian Football Hall of Famers like Danny Kepley and Danny Bass winning Defensive Player of the Year Awards and Willie Pless winning the trophy a record five times.

After winning the Grey Cup in both 2003 and 2005, under quarterback Ricky Ray, who is Edmonton's all-time leader in passing yards, the team missed the playoffs the following year, for the first time in 34 years, a North American professional sport record. This led to a ten-year Grey Cup drought. After a gap of ten years, Edmonton won the Grey Cup again in 2015, under the leadership of quarterback Mike Reilly, their most recent championship.

The term Eskimo is an offensive term placed on Inuit. In 2020 after pressure from sponsors Belairdirect and Boston Pizza, the team officially dropped all use of the word "Eskimo" from the team, temporarily rebranding as the "Edmonton Football Team" or, secondarily, the "EE Football Team", confirming their plan was to rebrand with a nickname starting with "E" to continue the use of at least some of their branding, most notably the interlocked double-E logo. This move was supported by multiple indigenous groups, including the Inuit Tapiriit Kanatami, a group representing over 60,000 Inuit across Canada. On June 1, 2021, it was formally announced that the new Edmonton team name would be the Edmonton Elks, a name used by the Edmonton football club of 1922.Franchise great Warren Moon, who led Edmonton to a record five straight Grey Cups between 1978 and 1982 stated, "The name Eskimos, to me, just means pride and it means winning with that organization". However, he stated that he was ultimately supportive of the move because some people might be offended by the name. Saying, “If this is something that is insensitive to another group of people, that is something I can understand being a minority myself.”

The team colours, green and gold, have remained essentially the same over the years with only minor modifications to the uniform or logo until 2021, when the EE logo was designated as a secondary logo, and introduced a new logo of a stylized image of an elk and the Elks helmet logo was changed to antlers. After keeping the elk-antler helmet for the 2021 season, the team reintroduced the EE logo to their helmets (albeit with it not being enclosed in an oval) in the 2022 offseason, acknowledging fan favourability towards the logo.

Team records and achievements
The Elks have won the Grey Cup more than any other team except the Toronto Argonauts, including more championships than any other since the CFL was formed in the 1950s. This places the Elks second overall to the Toronto Argonauts, who have won 17 Grey Cups (seven since the CFL was formed in 1954). The team also made playoffs for 37 consecutive years from 1927 to 2005, a North American professional sport record. Since re-entering the WIFU in 1949, Edmonton is the only team to have two dynasties of three or more successive Grey Cups: 1954–1956 and 1978–1982.

The Elks have also led the CFL in attendance for many years. As of August 2016, Edmonton had the highest average attendance in the league 27 times since moving to Commonwealth Stadium in 1978.

Team alumni have figured prominently in Alberta political life: past players include two former provincial premiers (Peter Lougheed and Donald Getty), a former mayor of Edmonton (Bill Smith), and a lieutenant-governor (Norman Kwong).

Wall of Honour 
The Edmonton Elks have a policy of honouring the players who have best represented the team on the field.  The player's name, number and seasons played with the Edmonton Elks are displayed on the edge of the concrete separating the field level from the lower bowl of Commonwealth Stadium.  The Elks keep the numbers in circulation rather than retire them from use.

Numbers so honoured :

† Honoured posthumously

Current roster

Current coaching staff

Head coaches

General managers

CFL awards and trophies 

Grey Cup
1954, 1955, 1956, 1975, 1978, 1979, 1980, 1981, 1982, 1987, 1993, 2003, 2005, 2015

N. J. Taylor Trophy

Grey Cup MVP
Dave Fennell (DT): 1978, 1982
Tom Wilkinson (QB): 1978
Warren Moon (QB): 1980, 1982
Dale Potter (LB): 1980
Damon Allen (QB): 1987, 1993
Stewart Hill (DE): 1987
Jason Tucker (WR): 2003
Ricky Ray (QB): 2005
Mike Reilly (QB): 2015

Dick Suderman Trophy
Garry Lefebvre (DB): 1973
Dave Cutler (K): 1975
Angelo Santucci (RB): 1978
Dale Potter (LB): 1980
Neil Lumsden (RB): 1981
Dave Fennell (DT): 1982
Milson Jones (RB): 1987
Sean Fleming (P/K): 1993
Mike Maurer (FB): 2005
Shamawd Chambers (WR): 2015

Most Outstanding Player Award
Billy Vessels (RB): 
Johnny Bright (RB): 
George McGowan (WR): 
Tom Wilkinson (QB): 
Warren Moon (QB): 
Tracy Ham (QB): 
Mike Reilly (QB): 

Most Outstanding Canadian Award
Norman Kwong (RB): , 
Dave Fennell (DT): 
Blake Marshall (FB): 
Leroy Blugh (DE): 
Kamau Peterson (WR): 
Jerome Messam (RB): 

Most Outstanding Defensive Player Award
Dave Fennell (DT): 
James Parker (LB): 
Danny Bass (LB): 
Elfrid Payton (DE): 
J. C. Sherritt (LB): 

Most Outstanding Offensive Lineman Award
Charlie Turner (OT): 
Michael Wilson (OT): , 
Rod Connop (C): 

Most Outstanding Lineman Award
Roger Nelson (OT): 
John LaGrone (DT): 

Most Outstanding Rookie Award
Brian Kelly (WR): 
Shalon Baker (WR): 
Dexter McCoil (LB): 
Derel Walker (WR): 

Annis Stukus Trophy
Ray Jauch: 
Hugh Campbell: 
Ron Lancaster: 
Tom Higgins: 

Tom Pate Memorial Award
David Boone (DE): 
Hector Pothier (OT): 
Rick Walters (SB): 
Adarius Bowman (WR): 
Ryan King (LS): 

Rogers Fans' Choice Award
Ricky Ray (QB): 

Defunct

Mascots 
Punter (an anthropomorphic football) and Spike (an elk) are the mascots for the Edmonton Elks. They were introduced in 2004 and 2021, respectively. Nanook, a polar bear, was introduced in 1997, but was retired and replaced with Spike in 2021, coinciding with the rebranding.

See also 
 Edmonton Elks all-time records and statistics
 Canadian Football Hall of Fame
 Canadian football
 Comparison of Canadian and American football
 List of Canadian Football League seasons
 List of fan-owned sports teams

References

External links 

 
 Watch Football Story, a 1953 National Film Board of Canada documentary about the Edmonton Eskimos

Edmonton Elks
Sports clubs established in 1949
Canadian Football League teams
Canadian football teams in Edmonton
1949 establishments in Alberta